Bakar (June 11, 1699 or April 7, 1700 – February 1, 1750) was a Georgian royal prince (batonishvili) of the Mukhrani branch of the Bagrationi dynasty and served as regent of the Kingdom of Kartli (eastern Georgia) from September 1716 to August 1719.

He was the son of King Vakhtang VI of Kartli by his wife, Rusudan of Circassia. Vakhtang left him in charge of the government of Kartli (eastern Georgia) during his absence at the Safavid court of Persia from September 1716 to August 1719. His position was recognized by the Shah of Persia who invested him, in 1717, with the title of janishin, a crown, sword, gold insignia, and robe of honor. At the same time, he had to nominally embrace Islam and assumed the name of Shah-Nawaz. On this occasion, he was appointed by the Shah the commander-in-chief of the Persian army and governor-general of Azerbaijan. In 1722, he was appointed as commander of the élite gholam corps (qollar-aghasi). When the Ottoman armies invaded Georgia in 1723, Bakar attempted to negotiate, but eventually followed his father in a Russian exile in July 1724. He permanently settled in Moscow where he came to be known as Tsarevich Bakar Vakhtangovich Gruzinsky. The prince engaged in cultural enterprises initiated by his father; he helped revive the Georgian printing house in Moscow and sponsored publication of The Bible in Georgian in 1743. 

Bakar was also involved in the Russian diplomatic and military service. In 1724, he was granted the village Lyskovo in hereditary possession. In November 1729, Bakar was promoted to lieutenant-general and appointed commander of artillery in the Moscow region. He died in Moscow in 1750 and was interred at the Donskoy Monastery.

Family
Bakar was married to Ana, daughter of Giorgi, Duke of Aragvi (1706 – 18 February 1780), who accompanied him in Russia and died in Moscow, being buried in the Donskoy Monastery. They had five children:
 Prince Alexander Gruzinsky (1726–1791), Russian army officer and claimant to the Georgian throne. 
 Prince Levan Gruzinsky (1739–1763), Russian army officer.   
 Princess Mariam (died 1807). 
 Princess Elisabed (died 1768), married to Prince Nikolay Odoyevsky.
 An anonymous daughter.

References

Sources
 

Year of birth uncertain
1750 deaths
Bakar of Georgia
Regents of Georgia
Safavid governors of Kartli
Safavid generals
Imperial Russian Army generals
Georgian generals in the Imperial Russian Army
Georgian lieutenant generals (Imperial Russia)
Safavid governors of Azerbaijan
Burials in Russia
Qollar-aghasi
18th-century people of Safavid Iran